Henry Poehler, (August 22, 1833 – July 18, 1912) was a U.S. Representative from Minnesota. Born in Hiddesen, Lippe-Detmold, Germany (now a part of Detmold), he attended his father’s academy and immigrated to the United States in April 1848, settling in Burlington, Iowa, where he attended the public schools. He moved to St. Paul, Minnesota, in 1853 and later on to Henderson, Sibley County, Minnesota, in 1854. He engaged in general merchandising and as a grain merchant and was appointed postmaster at Henderson, Minnesota onFebruary 25, 1856, serving until April 12, 1861. He served in the state house of representatives in 1857, 1858, and 1865, and served as county commissioner of Sibley County and chairman of the board from January 1865 to January 1868. He was member of the state senate in 1872 and 1873 and again in 1876 and 1877. He was elected as a Democrat to the Forty-sixth Congress, but was an unsuccessful candidate for reelection in 1880 to the Forty-seventh Congress and an unsuccessful candidate for Minnesota State Treasurer. He served as mayor of Henderson for several terms, later on moving to Minneapolis in 1889 and engaged in the general merchandise and grain business. He moved again to Los Angeles, California, in 1895. He died in Henderson, Minnesota, while on a visit to an interment in Major Joseph R. Brown Cemetery.

References
Minnesota Legislators past and Present

1833 births
1912 deaths
County commissioners in Minnesota
Democratic Party members of the Minnesota House of Representatives
Democratic Party Minnesota state senators
Democratic Party members of the United States House of Representatives from Minnesota
Mayors of places in Minnesota
People from Detmold
19th-century American politicians
People from Henderson, Minnesota
Minnesota postmasters
German emigrants to the United Kingdom